"Slow Acid" is a song by Scottish DJ and producer Calvin Harris for his fourth studio album, Motion (2014). It was released on 14 October 2014 as the album's first promotional single.

Music video
The official music video for the song, directed by Emil Nava, was uploaded onto Calvin Harris' Vevo channel on 15 October 2014. It has since been viewed over 9,000,000 times. It features a woman in blue going around in a city at night under the influence of drugs and alcohol, the blue colour indicating that she is under severe drug and alcohol use and has a hangover. She wakes up the next day lying on a road looking normal, apparently recovered from the hangover she experienced the previous night.

Track listing

Credits and personnel
 Calvin Harris – vocals, production, arrangement

Charts

Release history

References

2014 songs
Acid house songs
Calvin Harris songs
Instrumentals
Songs written by Calvin Harris